The Microsoft Support Diagnostic Tool (MSDT) is a service in Microsoft Windows that allows Microsoft technical support agents to analyze diagnostic data remotely for troubleshooting purposes. In April 2022 it was observed to have a security vulnerability that allowed remote code execution which was being exploited to attack computers in Russia and Belarus, and later against the Tibetan government in exile. Microsoft advised a temporary workaround of disabling the MSDT by editing the Windows registry.

Use
When contacting support the user is told to run MSDT and given a unique "passkey" which they enter. They are also given an "incident number" to uniquely identify their case. The MSDT can also be run offline which will generate a .CAB file which can be uploaded from a computer with an internet connection.

Windows versions
 Windows 7
 Windows 8.1
 Windows 10
 Windows 11

See also
 Follina (security vulnerability)

References

Windows services